The Morocco women's national handball team is the national team of Morocco. It is governed by the Royal Moroccan Handball Federation and takes part in international handball competitions.

African Championship record
1987 – 8th
2002 – 9th
2012 – 10th
2018 – 10th
2022 – 11th

External links
IHF profile

 

Women's national handball teams
Handball
National team